Pride of the Navy is a 1939 American action film directed by Charles Lamont and written by Ben Markson and Saul Elkins. The film stars James Dunn, Rochelle Hudson, Gordon Oliver, Horace McMahon, Gordon Jones and Charlotte Wynters. The film was released on January 23, 1939, by Republic Pictures.

Plot

Cast
James Dunn as Speed Brennan
Rochelle Hudson as Gloria Tyler
Gordon Oliver as Jerry Richards
Horace McMahon as Gloomey Kelly
Gordon Jones as Joe Falcon
Charlotte Wynters as Mrs. Falcon
Joseph Crehan as Brad Foster
Charles Trowbridge as Capt. Tyler

References

External links
 

1939 films
American action films
1930s action films
Republic Pictures films
Films directed by Charles Lamont
American black-and-white films
1930s English-language films
1930s American films